Waller's starling (Onychognathus walleri) is a species of starling in the family Sturnidae. It is found in Burundi, Cameroon, Democratic Republic of the Congo, Equatorial Guinea, Kenya, Malawi, Nigeria, Rwanda, South Sudan, Tanzania, Uganda, and Zambia.

The common name and scientific name commemorates the English naturalist Gerald Waller.

References

Waller's starling
Birds of the Gulf of Guinea
Birds of Central Africa
Birds of East Africa
Birds of Sub-Saharan Africa
Waller's starling
Taxonomy articles created by Polbot